The 2017 Canada Sevens was the fourth tournament within the 2016–17 World Rugby Women's Sevens Series. It was held over the weekend of 27–28 May 2017 at Westhills Stadium in Langford, Victoria, British Columbia.

New Zealand won the tournament and gold medal, defeating hosts Canada by 17–7 in the Cup final. Australia took third place over France by 26–12 in the play-off for bronze, while Fiji won the Challenge Trophy for ninth place.

Format
The teams were drawn into three pools of four teams each. Each team played every other team in their pool once. The top two teams from each pool advanced to the Cup brackets, together with the two best third-placed teams. The other teams from each group played off for the Challenge Trophy.

Teams

Pool stage

Pool A

Pool B

Pool C

Knockout stage

Challenge Trophy

5th Place

Cup

Source: World Rugby

Tournament placings

Source: World Rugby

See also
 2016–17 World Rugby Women's Sevens Series
 World Rugby Women's Sevens Series
 World Rugby

References

External links
Official website

2017
2016–17 World Rugby Women's Sevens Series
2017 in Canadian women's sports
2017 in women's rugby union
May 2017 sports events in Canada
Sports competitions in British Columbia